Anders Nielsen (born 6 December 1970) is a Danish former footballer who played as a forward. He has played for a number of clubs in Belgian football. He is currently assistant manager of Antwerp.

Club career
He started his career as an amateur with Denmark Series club Nakskov BK and Danish 2nd Division teams Helsingør IF and Hellerup IK.

Belgium
In 1994, he moved abroad to play professionally for K. Sint-Truidense V.V., Club Brugge K.V., K.A.A. Gent, Royal Antwerp FC, K. Beringen-Heusden-Zolder, K.V. Red Star Waasland, and JV De Pinte in Belgium. While at Gent, he underwent loan deals at AC Omonia, winning the 2000–01 Cypriot First Division championship, and AGF in Denmark.

He ended his active career in 2007.

International career
He played one unofficial national team match in 1996.

Management career
In 2009, he became part-time youth coach at Odense Boldklub. At the same time he started as sales consultant at BK Marienlyst. In 2011, he was named new full-time manager of BK Marienlyst. He stepped down following the 2014-15 season.

In 2015 he took a hiatus from football, but returned in 2016 as youth coach of Vejle Boldklub. In the summer of 2017 he became new manager of Dalum IF in the Danish 2nd Divisions.

Honours

Club
AC Omonia
Cypriot First Division: 2000–01

References

External links

Danish national team profile
Danish Superliga statistics

Profile - FC Antwerp

1970 births
Living people
Danish men's footballers
Danish expatriate men's footballers
Danish Superliga players
Belgian Pro League players
Cypriot First Division players
Sint-Truidense V.V. players
Club Brugge KV players
K.A.A. Gent players
AC Omonia players
Aarhus Gymnastikforening players
Royal Antwerp F.C. players
Expatriate footballers in Belgium
Expatriate footballers in Cyprus
Danish football managers
Association football forwards
Dalum IF managers